The following is a list of countries by exports of aircraft, including helicopters, and spacecraft (Harmonized System code 8802). Data is for 2016, in billions of United States dollars, as reported by The Observatory of Economic Complexity. Currently the top twenty countries are listed.

Note: Export realized under secret code are not counted. The use of secret code is particularly frequent for military equipment, including military aircraft. Example: Russia exported 14 fighter aircraft Su-30 in the year 2016, as well as other types of military aircraft. Depending on sources, the Su-30 are sold at more or less US$50 million per unit.

Sources
 

Aerospace
Aircraft and spacecraft